Route 463, also known as Lourdes Road, is a rural highway in Newfoundland and Labrador that leads from Route 460 at Abraham's Cove to Cape St. George. Along with Route 460, Route 463 also carries the designation of the French Ancestors Route.

Route description

Route 463 begins in Cape St. George at an intersection with Route 460 (Port au Port Highway) near the entrance to Boutte du Cap Park. It heads northward through rural areas for several kilometres to join the western coastline of the peninsula at Mainland. The highway heads northeast to passing through that town, along with Three Rock Cove, before passing through Lourdes, where it turns southeast along the northern coastline of the peninsula at an intersection with a local road leading to Black Duck Brook and Winterhouse. Route 463 now passes through Tea Cove, West Bay, West Bay Centre, Piccadilly Head (where it passes by Piccadilly Head Regional Park), Piccadilly Slant, and Piccadilly before finally arriving at Abraham's Cove, where Route 463 comes to an end at another intersection with Route 460.

Major intersections

See also 
List of Newfoundland and Labrador highways

References

463